Sandu Mitrofan (born 8 October 1952) is a Romanian bobsledder. He competed in the four man event at the 1980 Winter Olympics.

References

1952 births
Living people
Romanian male bobsledders
Olympic bobsledders of Romania
Bobsledders at the 1980 Winter Olympics
Place of birth missing (living people)